Michael of Bosnia (after 1243 – before 23 March 1266), Duke of Bosnia from 1262 to 1266, was a member of the Rurik dynasty.

He was the son of Duke Rostislav of Macsó and his wife, Anna, a daughter of King Béla IV of Hungary. When Duke Rostislav died in 1262, his lands were divided between his sons: Michael inherited their father’s part of Bosnia, and Béla inherited the Banate of Macsó.

When Michael died, his lands were inherited by his brother.

References

Sources

 
 
 
 
 
 
 
.
 

Olgovichi family
13th-century Hungarian people
Dukes of Bosnia